Scipio Township is one of the twelve townships of Meigs County, Ohio, United States.  The 2000 census found 1,050 people in the township.

Geography
Located in the northwestern part of the county, it borders the following townships:
Alexander Township, Athens County - north
Lodi Township, Athens County - northeast corner
Bedford Township - east
Salisbury Township - southeast corner
Rutland Township - south
Salem Township - southwest corner
Columbia Township - west
Lee Township, Athens County - northwest corner

No municipalities are located in Scipio Township.

Name and history
Statewide, the only other Scipio Township is located in Seneca County.

Government
The township is governed by a three-member board of trustees, who are elected in November of odd-numbered years to a four-year term beginning on the following January 1. Two are elected in the year after the presidential election and one is elected in the year before it. There is also an elected township fiscal officer, who serves a four-year term beginning on April 1 of the year after the election, which is held in November of the year before the presidential election. Vacancies in the fiscal officership or on the board of trustees are filled by the remaining trustees.

References

External links
County website

Townships in Meigs County, Ohio
Townships in Ohio